DionneDionne is a 2015 tribute album to Dionne Warwick by jazz singer Dionne Farris and guitarist Charlie Hunter. According to Hunter's website, "Charlie Hunter and Dionne Farris have planned to work with each other since they met on a Hip Hop tour working for two different groups in 1991. The inspiration for this project came in part from a mutual admiration for Dionne’s namesake, and an instant musical chemistry."

Critical reception
The editorial staff at AllMusic Guide scored this album four out of five stars, awarding it the Best of 2014. Reviewer Matt Collar characterized the release as "a creatively inspired collaboration and deeply heartfelt homage".

Track listing
All songs written by Burt Bacharach and Hal David except where noted.

"(Fat) Alfie" – 3:29
"Walk the Way You Talk" – 3:09
"Always Something There to Remind Me" – 4:15
"Don't Make Me Over" – 4:52
"Wives and Lovers" – 4:24
"Loneliness Remembers (What Happiness Forgets)" – 2:03
"Deja Vu" (Anderson and Hayes) – 4:14
"Walk on By" – 3:45
"You're Gonna Need Me" (Holland) – 4:03

Personnel 
 Dionne Farris – vocals, production
 Charlie Hunter – seven-string guitar, production

Technical personnel
 Anthony Creamer – executive producer
 John Davis – recording and mixing
Tahi Hunter – photography
David McNain – mastering

References

2014 albums
Dionne Farris albums
Charlie Hunter albums
Collaborative albums
Dionne Warwick